The juniper pug or juniper looper (Eupithecia pusillata) is a moth of the family Geometridae. The species was first described by Michael Denis and Ignaz Schiffermüller in 1775. It is found throughout the Palearctic and in the Nearctic.

Subspecies E. p. interruptofasciata is sometimes treated as a valid species Eupithecia interruptofasciata.

The forewings are greyish brown often with two distinctive black cross bands. It is relatively contrastingly coloured, with marked, light and dark cross-bands and short black longitudinal lines. It often lacks a black spot in the middle of the wing (discal spot). It is extremely variable but generally easy to recognize by the acutely angulated antemedian line, the whitish patch between discal dot and the postmedian and dark dashes proximally to the postmedian — graeseriata Ratzer (= latoniata Mill.) is larger and greyer is in general more weakly marked but very variable (Swiss Alps). — anglicata H-Sch. from the chalk cliffs of Kent, is a whitish grey form of rather characteristic appearance. — scoriata Stgr. from Iceland, is a dark, weakly-marked form. 

The larva has a number of short brushes and numerous small white warts. The body is green, along the back it has either a simple, dark back strip or a variety of bell-shaped, dark brown spots.

The adults fly at night from July to September, and are attracted to light.

In the Old World, the larva feeds on Juniperus (juniper) and some other conifers in the cypress family such as Chamaecyparis and Thuja. In the New World, there is a greater range of recorded food plants including apple, clover, raspberry, redcurrant, strawberry, sunflower and willow as well as juniper. The species overwinters as an egg.

Subspecies
Eupithecia pusillata pusillata
Eupithecia pusillata interruptofasciata Packard, 1873 (eastern United States and Canada)
Eupithecia pusillata kashmirica Mironov & Ratzel, 2008 (Pakistan)
Eupithecia pusillata scoriata Staudinger, 1857

Notes
The flight season refers to the British Isles. This may vary in other parts of the range.

References

Chinery, Michael (1986, reprinted 1991). Collins Guide to the Insects of Britain and Western Europe.
Skinner, Bernard (1984). The Colour Identification Guide to Moths of the British Isles.

External links

Lepiforum e.V.

Eupithecia
Moths described in 1775
Moths of Asia
Moths of Europe
Taxa named by Michael Denis
Taxa named by Ignaz Schiffermüller